Transmission balise-locomotive (Dutch: Transmissie Baken Locomotief) (TBL) (English: "Beacon-to-Locomotive Transmission") is a train protection system used in Belgium and (until 2021) on Hong Kong's East Rail line.

Versions

TBL1 

The TBL system is designed to stop a train passing a red signal, with operating speeds of up to 160 km/h. In 2006 13% of the Belgium train network used the original TBL system, introduced in 1982.

The system requires the train driver to manually acknowledge a warning when passing a double yellow signal (similar to the Memor/Le Crocodile system), as well as stopping a train automatically if it passes a red signal.

TBL1+ 
TBL1+ began to be installed on the Belgian rail network in 2006, with full conversion to the system expected by 2012. The system is a development of TBL1, but uses Eurobalises, providing compatibility for later reconfiguration to an ETCS system. An additional safety measure is the addition of an additional balise 300m up-line, which forces an automatic stop on trains travelling at more than 40 km/h ahead of a red signal.

The roll-out of TBL1+ was accelerated after the Halle train collision on 15 February 2010, which killed 19 and injured 171 people. An upgraded version, TBL1++ was also unable to prevent the 2017 Leuven derailment while ETCS would have.

Similar to the Swiss EuroSignum approach, it simply converts the aspects from TBL1 into a digital transmission packet so that it is compatible with ETCS, while not interfering with ETCS functionality, by using the national datagram (packet number 44) that is defined in the ERTMS / ETCS specification requirements specification (subset 026).

TBL2/3 
The TBL2/3 system is nearly identical to the Dutch ATB-NG, and allows operating at speeds of up to 300 km/h. The system is used on the high speed line between Bierbeek (Leuven) and Ans (Liège).

All other high-speed lines will be equipped with ETCS level 2, as shown in the network statement published by Infrabel on its website. Line 4, linking Antwerp to the Dutch High Speed Line South, is equipped with both Level 2 and, as fallback, Level 1.

Overseas usage
The TBL system has been in use by local trains on Hong Kong's East Rail line, a trunk line of the MTR network, since the late 1990s. It was intended as a replacement for the line's original Automatic Warning System (AWS), a British train protection system, so as to allow for increased traffic and capacity on the East Rail line. With the introduction of an Automatic train operation (ATO) system supplied by Alstom in 2002 the said TBL system now functions as the safety-critical part of the said ATO system, and also serves as a fallback in case the ATO system fails or is not available. Intercity trains, which use the East Rail line within Hong Kong territory but do not stop, continue to operate with AWS.

TBL on the East Rail line is due to be replaced in 2020 with a communications-based train control (CBTC) system, similar to that on the West Rail line, as part of the Sha Tin to Central Link upgrades. However, on the day where the CBTC system was supposed to be deployed, it encountered some signalling faults, hence it was changed back to the TBL system. In February 2021, MTR announced that the TBL system will be phased out on 6 February 2021 and the CBTC system will be put into service with the MTR R-Trains.

The ATP system installed on the Great Western Main Line in the United Kingdom is based on TBL.

References

External links

Train protection systems